Sir Frank Cavendish Lascelles  (23 March 1841 – 2 January 1920) was a British diplomat. He served as Ambassador to both Russia and Germany.

Background and education
Lascelles was born in London, the fifth son of William Lascelles, himself the third son of Henry Lascelles, 2nd Earl of Harewood. His mother was Lady Caroline Howard, daughter of George Howard, 6th Earl of Carlisle. He was educated at Harrow and joined the Diplomatic Service in 1861.

Diplomatic career
Lascelles served in junior positions at the British embassies in Madrid, Paris, Rome, Washington D.C., and Athens. He was trained in the diplomatic service by Richard Lyons, 1st Viscount Lyons, and was a member of the Tory-sympathetic 'Lyons School' of British diplomacy. Lascelles was Consul-General in Egypt from 20 March to 10 October 1879, during the last years of the reign of Khedive Isma'il Pasha. In 1879 Lascelles became Consul-General in Bulgaria, which had been an autonomous principality since the Treaty of Berlin of 1878. He remained in Bulgaria until 1887, and was then Minister (similar to ambassador) to Romania from 1887 to 1891 and to Persia from 1891 to 1894, where his niece Gertrude Bell visited him, starting a lifelong passion for travel. He served briefly as Ambassador to Russia between 1894 and 1895, but in the latter year he was appointed to succeed Sir Edward Malet as Ambassador to Germany.

His tenure in Berlin saw the growing estrangement between Germany and the UK, and Lascelles notably had to deal with the effects of the Kruger telegram only days after his arrival. His relationship with Emperor Wilhelm II was always cordial but he was known to resent the policies of Chancellor Bernhard von Bülow. He resigned as ambassador in 1908 but continued to exercise influence over Anglo-German relations up until the First World War.

Lascelles was knighted KCMG in 1886, promoted to GCMG in 1892, appointed GCB in 1897, and GCVO in 1904 following King Edward VII's meeting with Emperor Wilhelm II at Kiel.  He was admitted to the Privy Council in 1894.

Family

In 1869 Lascelles married Mary Emma Olliffe (1845–1897), daughter of Sir Joseph Olliffe who was physician to the British Embassy in Paris. They had three children:
William Frank Lascelles (21 March 1863 – 8 March 1913), married Lady Sybil Beauclerk (1871–1910), daughter of William Beauclerk, 10th Duke of St Albans.
Gerald Claud Lascelles (19 July 1869 – 26 June 1919), married Cecil Raffo.
Florence Caroline Lascelles (27 January 1876 – 9 December 1961), married Sir Cecil Spring Rice.

Lascelles survived his wife by over twenty years and died in 1920, aged 78. He is buried in Brompton Cemetery, London.

References

Bibliography

External links 

 The Papers of Sir Frank Lascelles held at Churchill Archives Centre

1841 births
1920 deaths
Frank
People educated at Harrow School
British consuls-general in Egypt
Ambassadors of the United Kingdom to Romania
Ambassadors of the United Kingdom to Iran
Ambassadors of the United Kingdom to Russia
Ambassadors of the United Kingdom to Germany
Knights Grand Cross of the Order of the Bath
Knights Grand Cross of the Order of St Michael and St George
Knights Grand Cross of the Royal Victorian Order
Members of the Privy Council of the United Kingdom
Burials at Brompton Cemetery